Tony Pilkington is a South Australian radio personality. He is best known for "Bazz and Pilko", his long running breakfast show partnership with Barry Ion. Their show aired in Adelaide from 1976 to 1984, then Sydney from 1985 to 1991, then back in Adelaide until 1996. He continued to work at Adelaide's 5AA until retiring in 2010. 

After nine years of semi-retirement, Pilko is set for a return to Adelaide airwaves once again. As of 2020 Pilkington will host the afternoon show, 12:30 to 3pm weekdays on Adelaide's 5AA.

Discography

Studio albums

Compilation albums

Singles

References

External links
 tonypilkington.com.au
 Extract from book the Bazz & Pilko Years by Peter Plus, Barry Ion, Adelaide Advertiser, 18 October 2013
 Where Are They Now? Tony Pilkington, Australian Broadcasting Corporation, 2 October 2013

Living people
Australian radio personalities
Year of birth missing (living people)